Strageath Halt railway station served the village of Muthill, in the historic county of Perthshire, Scotland, from 1958 to 1964 on the Crieff Junction Railway.

History
The station was opened on 15 September 1958 by the Scottish Region of British Railways. It was a request stop. It was a short-lived station, only being open for under 6 years before closing on 6 July 1964.

References

Disused railway stations in Perth and Kinross
Railway stations opened by British Rail
Beeching closures in Scotland
Railway stations in Great Britain opened in 1958
Railway stations in Great Britain closed in 1964
1958 establishments in Scotland
1964 disestablishments in Scotland